Pietro di Bagnara or Pietro Bagnara Bacchi (Imola, 16th century) was an Italian monk and painter.

He is styled as a follower of Raphael, mainly by virtue of his use of colors. He was a member of the Augustinian order of Canons Regular of the Lateran. He lived in the monastery attached to the Basilica of Santa Maria in Porto of Ravenna, where circa 1550 he painted a St. Sebastian, and a St Lawrence altarpiece for a chapel, a large canvas of the multiplication of the bread in the refectory and beautiful arabesques with a crucifixion in the ceiling of said refectory. In 1537 at Verdace for the church of San Giovanni, he painted a Madonna with Saints Augustine and John the Baptist. The background has a landscape and holy conversation. In 1579, for the Church of Santa Maria della Passione in Milan, he painted a Jesus on the road to Calvary (Andata al Calvario). The Museum of Padua has two canvases, originally found in the church of San Giovanni di Verdara, painted by Bagnara: Visitation (1537) and a Madonna. He signed his work with "Orate Deum pro anima  pictoris" ("Pray God for the soul of this painter").

References

16th-century Italian painters
Italian male painters
Italian Renaissance painters
Augustinian canons